The WDF Europe Youth Cup is an youth darts tournament held annually since 1990.



Tournament structure

The tournament consists of a team championship, a pairs championship and a singles championship. All events have a boys' competition, and a girls' competition. The most recent Europe Youth Cup was held in 2016, in Budapest, Hungary.

Previous winners

References

External links
 Official site for the 2009 Europe Youth Cup
 WDF Official Website

1990 establishments in Europe
Darts tournaments